Herniaria glabra, the smooth rupturewort, is a plant of the family Caryophyllaceae, and grows in North America and Europe. It contains herniarin, a methoxy analog of umbelliferone.

References

External links

glabra
Flora of Europe
Flora of Lebanon
Plants described in 1753
Taxa named by Carl Linnaeus